Park Dae-han is a Korean name consisting of the family name Park (박) and the given name Dae-han (대한). It may refer to:

 Park Dae-han (footballer, born 1991), South Korean footballer
 Park Dae-han (footballer, born 1996), South Korean footballer